St Josephs Grammar School (Irish: Scoil Ghramadaí Naomh Iósaef), Donaghmore, County Tyrone, Northern Ireland, is a Catholic school catering for 700 pupils aged between 11 and 18.

History
It was founded by the Daughters of the Cross originally from Belgium, who had been active in Britain and Ireland since 1869. Canon Joseph O’Neill of Donaghmore  invited the order to establish a convent and school in 1920. Miss Frances Ellis, a great benefactress of the Daughters of the Cross, donated the then-significant sum of £987 for the school at the time of its foundation. It was an all-girls school, until 2003, when it became co-ed. In 2007 the religious sisters left the school and it is now entirely staffed by lay teachers.

Academics
In 2018, 92.8% of its entrants achieved five or more GCSEs at grades A* to C, including the core subjects English and Maths.

86.1% of its A-level students who sat the exams in 2017/18 were awarded three A*-C grades.

References

External links
St Joseph's Convent Grammar School website

Catholic secondary schools in Northern Ireland